Tiago Filipe Fernandes Martins (born 28 September 1998) is a Portuguese footballer who plays for SD Huesca B, as a goalkeeper.

Football career
On 13 May 2018, Martins made his professional debut with  Vitória Guimarães B in a 2017–18 LigaPro match against Nacional.

On 4 August 2021, Martins signed for Spanish club SD Huesca B.

References

External links

1998 births
Living people
People from Tavira
Portuguese footballers
Portuguese expatriate footballers
Association football goalkeepers
Liga Portugal 2 players
Segunda Divisão players
S.C. Olhanense players
Padroense F.C. players
FC Porto players
C.F. Os Belenenses players
Vitória S.C. B players
U.D. Vilafranquense players
SD Huesca B players
Portugal youth international footballers
Portuguese expatriate sportspeople in Spain
Expatriate footballers in Spain
Sportspeople from Faro District